Ipolochagos Natassa (Greek: Υπολοχαγός Νατάσσα, Lieutenant Natasha, also known outside Greece as Battlefield Constantinople) is a 1970 Greek film. It starred Aliki Vougiouklaki as Natassa, Dimitris Papamichael as Orestis, and Costas Carras as Max. The story about the German occupation of Greece and the resistance by the Greeks.  The director of the film is Nikos Foskolos.

Cast

Aliki Vougiouklaki .... Natassa Arseni
Dimitris Papamichael .... Orestis
Costas Carras .... Max Reuter
Eleni Zafeiriou .... Natassa's mother
Kakia Panagiotou .... Liza
Andreas Filippidis .... Natassa's father
Spyros Kalogirou .... major

External links

Greek war drama films
1970s Greek-language films
1970 films
Finos Film films
Films set in Axis-occupied Greece
Films set in Greece
Greek World War II films
Films about Greek resistance